Charles Guy Fulke Greville, 7th Earl of Warwick, 7th Earl Brooke (4 March 1911 – 20 January 1984), was a British peer and the last Earl of Warwick to live at the family seat Warwick Castle before its sale in 1978. He became the first British aristocrat to star in a Hollywood movie, and was later nicknamed the Duke of Hollywood by the local press.

Early life

Charles Guy Fulke Greville was born at 13a Lower Grosvenor Place West, London on 4 March 1911.  He was the eldest son of Leopold Greville, 6th Earl of Warwick (1882–1928) and his wife Elfrida Marjorie Eden (1887–1943), the only daughter of Sir William Eden, 7th Baronet.  "Fulkie", as he was known to intimates, had two younger brothers, Richard Francis Maynard Greville, a Governor of University College Hospital, and John Ambrose Henry Greville, who was killed in action in 1942 during World War II.

His paternal grandparents were Francis Greville, 5th Earl of Warwick and his wife, Daisy Greville, Countess of Warwick.  His grandmother Daisy inherited the Maynard estates in 1865 from her grandfather, Henry Maynard, 3rd Viscount Maynard, and reportedly was a long-term mistress to the Prince of Wales, who later became King Edward VII.

Greville was educated at Eton and at Chillon College, Lake Geneva in Switzerland. He succeeded to the earldom at the age of 16 in January 1928, on the death of his father (who had only become the 6th Earl four years earlier in 1924). He joined the Grenadier Guards after completing his education.

Career

Acting career 
In the 1920s and 1930s, many British actors found work in the American film industry; Sheridan Morley called this the "Hollywood Raj". In 1936, Lord Warwick became the first British aristocrat to be offered a Hollywood contract by MGM. He was to receive £200 a year, and the services of a valet and secretary.

Newspaper reports at the time suggested his reasoning for taking a film contract was sex motivated. He referred to his wages as his own "pocket money" and that he was 'simply seeking a job like everyone else'. He used the stage name Michael Brooke to distance himself from his aristocratic background. After six months he was dropped by MGM resulting in a long court battle thereafter.

As the highest-profile Englishman in Hollywood, Charles became a celebrity figure with nicknames like 'The Duke of Hollywood' and 'Warwick the Filmmaker' (a pun on Warwick the Kingmaker). Listed with a string of high-profile affairs including Greta Garbo, Marlene Dietrich and Paulette Goddard, he was famed for socialising within celebrity circles.

In 1938, he was offered another chance at acting through Paramount. He finally got his chance to star in a movie and was given a lead role in The Dawn Patrol alongside David Niven and Errol Flynn. This would be his only mainstream movie however, and he was subsequently dropped thereafter.

The Earl of Warwick 

Following his failure in America, and with the start of World War II, Warwick returned to the United Kingdom. Coventry, near his family seat, suffered tremendous aerial bombing, and he opened his home to evacuees from the city, as well as to the Ministry of Supplies. It was rumoured that Nazi war criminal Rudolf Hess was held at Warwick Castle for one night while being transported from Scotland to London.

He was Mayor of Warwick between 1951 and 1952, organising great celebrations for the success of the boxer Randolph Turpin upon his becoming World Middleweight Champion, and, although not then Mayor, hosted King George VI and Queen Elizabeth at Warwick Castle when they visited Warwick and Leamington in 1951.

Warwick was a Conservative member of the House of Lords; his political actions included successfully opposing certain agricultural measures. He supported his uncle Anthony Eden who succeeded Winston Churchill in the 1950s.

Later life 

In 1955, Lord Warwick bought homes in Switzerland, Italy, and France and begin travelling between all three.  In 1957, he funded and established the illustrious Eagle Ski Club in Gstaad, Switzerland, becoming its first honorary President.

Throughout the next decade, Charles, widely described as one Britain's richest men, began to sell many of the family possessions, including estates in Warwick, heirlooms, and much of the armour collection at Warwick Castle.  In 1969, he left England altogether to avoid British income taxes, moving to Rome.

In 1967, he handed over control of his family estate to his son David Greville, Lord Brooke.  His son sold Warwick Castle to Madame Tussauds in 1978, causing a public confrontation between father and son.

Personal life
Lord Warwick was married three times. He was also engaged to Margaret Whigham, later Duchess of Argyll, but the engagement was broken off in March 1932.  His first marriage took place on 11 July 1933 to his second cousin, Rose Bingham, daughter of David Cecil Bingham (a granddaughter of the 5th Earl of Rosslyn and Gen. Sir Cecil Bingham and a descendant of the 4th Earl of Lucan).  Before their 1938 divorce, Charles and Rose were the parents of one son:

 David Robin Francis Guy Greville, 8th Earl of Warwick (1934–1996), who married Sarah Anne Chester Beatty, daughter of Sir Alfred Chester Beatty (the "King of Copper"), in 1956. They divorced in 1967 and she married Harry Thomson Jones.

After their divorce, Rose married three more times before her death in 1972.  Lord Warwick's second marriage took place on 19 February 1942 to Mary Kathleen (née Hopkinson) Bell.  Mary, the former wife of Harold Edward Bell, was the eldest daughter of Percy Clifford Hopkinson of Seabarn in Kingston Gorse. In 1947, he pleaded guilty to "cashing two checks at Cannes, France, thus receiving francs for pounds in violation of British Treasury regulations" and was fined £1,150.  They divorced in 1949.

Lord Warwick married thirdly in November 1963 to Janine Joséphine Detry de Marès, a daughter of Georges Detry de Marès, a Belgian newspaper magnate.

Upon the death of Lord Warwick in Rome on 20 January 1984, David Greville, 8th Earl of Warwick, his only son by his first wife, inherited his titles.  He was buried at St. Mary's Church, Warwick.

References

External links

1911 births
1984 deaths
People educated at Eton College
British expatriates in Switzerland
British expatriates in Italy
British expatriates in France
Earls in the Peerage of Great Britain
Charles
7